Itohan Aikhionbare (born March 29, 1994) is a Belize-American athlete who competes in Shot put and Discus throw.

Prep
Itohan Aikhionbare grew up in Eagle Rock, California and is a 2011 graduate of La Salle High School (Pasadena, California). Aikhionbare represented the La Salle HS Mounted Lancer and Del Rey League in CIF Southern Section and California Interscholastic Federation state championships. Itohan Aikhionbare was 1st team all-league in basketball and track & field in 2009-2011.

NCAA
Aikhionbare won two Big West Conference champion in 2014 and NCAA Division I All-American in Shot Put in 2016. Aikhionbare moved another step up University of Oregon's career best list in the shot put with a winning throw of 54 feet, 4 ½ inches. She now is No. 2 in Oregon history, behind only teammate Brittany Mann. Aikhionbare holds the top mark in UC Irvine Anteaters history as the best shot put 53 feet, 9 inches. Aikhionbare is also a two-time UCI/Big West Scholar-Athlete of the Year.

Professional
Aikhionbare competes for Belize Athletic Association international competitions. On June 17, 2016, Aikhionbare threw  at 2016 Central American Championships in Athletics setting a Central American Championships record.

References

External links
 
 
 Itohan Aikhionbare at All-Athletics 
 Itohan Aikhionbare at University of Oregon
 
 
 

1994 births
Living people
University of California alumni
UC Irvine Anteaters athletes
American female discus throwers
American female shot putters
Belizean shot putters
Belize at the Central American and Caribbean Games
Belizean discus throwers
21st-century American women